Chiljapyx is a genus of diplurans in the family Japygidae.

Species
 Chiljapyx clatagironei Smith, 1962

References

Diplura